The 1974-1975 FIRA Trophy was the 15th edition of a Continental European rugby union championship for national teams, and the second with the formula and name of "FIRA Trophy".

The tournament was won by Romania, who defeated France in the opening match.

First division 
Table

 Czechoslovakia relegated to division 2
Results

Second Division 
Table

 Netherlands and Poland promoted to division 1
Results

Bibliography 
 Francesco Volpe, Valerio Vecchiarelli (2000), 2000 Italia in Meta, Storia della nazionale italiana di rugby dagli albori al Sei Nazioni, GS Editore (2000) .
 Francesco Volpe, Paolo Pacitti (Author), Rugby 2000, GTE Gruppo Editorale (1999).

References 

1974–75 in European rugby union
1974–75
1975 rugby union tournaments for national teams
1974 rugby union tournaments for national teams